Octopussy is a 1983 James Bond film, or its title character.

Octopussy may also refer to:

 Octopussy and The Living Daylights or Octopussy, a 1966 James Bond story collection by Ian Fleming, or the title story
 Octopussy (soundtrack), a soundtrack album from the 1983 film
 Octopussy (adventure), a 1983 adventure for the role-playing game James Bond 007
 Octopussy (software), a log management computer software by Sebastien Thebert
 Octopussy, a Heesen Yacht